John Dobson Lawther (September 19, 1899 – September 21, 1996) was an American football and basketball coach and professor. He was the head basketball coach of Westminster College from 1925 to 1930 and again from 1931 to 1936 and Pennsylvania State University from 1936 to 1949. Lawther guided Penn State to an appearance in the 1942 NCAA basketball tournament. After leaving coaching, Lawther became a professor and athletic administrator at Penn State and became a fellow of the American College of Sports Medicine.

Lawther was an alumnus of Westminster College and earned a master's degree from Columbia University.

Head coaching record

College football

College basketball

Notes

References

External links
 

1899 births
1996 deaths
American men's basketball coaches
Columbia University alumni
Penn State Nittany Lions basketball coaches
Westminster Titans football coaches
Westminster Titans men's basketball coaches
Pennsylvania State University faculty 
Westminster College (Pennsylvania) alumni